The Greatest Holiday Classics is the fourth greatest hits album by saxophonist Kenny G. It was released by Arista Records in October 18, 2005, and peaked at number 1 on the Contemporary Jazz chart, number 26 on the R&B/Hip-Hop Albums chart and number 39 on the Billboard 200.

Track listing
"We Wish You a Merry Christmas" (Traditional) – 2:36
"Deck the Halls / The Twelve Days of Christmas" (Traditional) – 3:01
"Joy to the World" (Lowell Mason/Isaac Watts) – 2:29
"Have Yourself a Merry Little Christmas" (Hugh Martin/Ralph Blane) – 3:56
"Sleigh Ride" (Leroy Anderson/Mitchell Parish) – 3:48
"Miracles" (Kenny G/Walter Afanasieff) – 2:32
"Jingle Bell Rock" (Joseph Beal/James Boothe) – 3:33
"White Christmas" (Irving Berlin) – 3:02
"Winter Wonderland" (Dick Smith/Felix Bernard) – 3:03
"My Favorite Things" (Oscar Hammerstein II/Richard Rodgers) – 3:19
"We Three Kings / Carol of the Bells" (John Henry Hopkins/Mikhail Leontovich/Peter Wilhousky) – 4:08
"Let It Snow! Let It Snow! Let It Snow!" (Sammy Cahn/Jule Styne) – 3:09
"Ave Maria" (Franz Schubert) – 4:30
"The Chanukah Song" (Kenny G/Walter Afanasieff) – 2:30
"Jingle Bells" (James Pierpont) – 2:33
"I'll Be Home for Christmas" (Kim Gannon/Walter Kent/Buck Ram) - 3:29

Singles

References

Albums produced by Walter Afanasieff
Albums produced by Clive Davis
Kenny G compilation albums
2005 Christmas albums
Christmas albums by American artists
Jazz Christmas albums
Christmas compilation albums
2005 greatest hits albums
Arista Records Christmas albums
Arista Records compilation albums